Dylan Pinaula Naputi (born 4 January 1995) is a Guamanian international footballer.

Career
Naputi began his soccer career with Quality Distributors FC in the Guam Men's Soccer League while attending George Washington High School in Barrigada, Guam. After his graduation in 2013, he transferred to Payless Supermarket Strykers FC.

On January 5, 2016, Naputi joined the PDL side, Ventura County Fusion.

International
He made his first appearance for the Guam national football team in 2011.

International goals
Scores and results list the Guam's goal tally first.

References

1995 births
Living people
Guamanian footballers
Guam international footballers
Quality Distributors players
People from Barrigada
Association football midfielders